P. rubra  may refer to:
 Paradisaea rubra, the red bird-of-paradise or Cendrawasih Merah, a bird species
 Piranga rubra, the summer tanager, a medium-sized American songbird species
 Plumeria rubra, the red frangipani or common frangipani, a deciduous tree species
 Pseudostomatella rubra, a sea snail species

See also
 Rubra (disambiguation)